The Hyundai Genesis is an executive four-door, five passenger, rear or all-wheel-drive full-size luxury sedan manufactured and marketed by Hyundai. The Hyundai Genesis debuted in 2008 until Genesis spun off as a separate entity in 2017, rebadging the vehicle as the G80. Introduced in concept form at the 2007 New York International Auto Show, and internally designated as the BH model, the Genesis was expected to cost $533 million to develop. Hyundai began marketing the first generation Genesis worldwide (except in Europe) in 2008 as a "premium sports sedan". The second generation Genesis (model DH) debuted in Seoul, Korea in November 2013 followed by the 2014 North American International Auto Show and Toronto Auto Show. It is marketed worldwide. On 4 November 2015, Hyundai officially separated Genesis into its own luxury division, Genesis Motor. The leap into a stand-alone, luxury brand came on the heels of marked success in the luxury market, paired with consumer demand for the Genesis name.



Development and design

Introduced in March 2007 as the "Concept Genesis", the sedan was designed by Hyundai as a "progressive interpretation of the modern rear-wheel drive sports sedan". Hyundai conceived the idea for the Genesis in 2003. The body design took three years and the total cost of the program was $500 million over a development period of 23 months. Reliability testing ran for 800,000 miles.

Hyundai reportedly benchmarked the BMW 5 Series (E60) sedan during the Genesis' development; the company's press release indicates the Genesis body in white exceeds the BMW in torsional rigidity by 14%. The production Genesis sedan received a five-star crash rating in every category from the National Highway Traffic Safety Administration. Hyundai markets the Genesis as offering "the performance of a BMW 5-Series and the interior packaging of a 7-Series at the price of a 3-Series".

Reviewing the Genesis 4.6 at its US introduction, automotive journalist Dan Neil called the absence of brand emblems at the front of the Genesis "a move that subverts the grammar of luxury".

First generation (BH; 2008)

The Genesis was announced in Seoul and later unveiled at the 2008 North American International Auto Show. The first generation was marketed worldwide except in the European market.

Equipment included a speed-sensitive rack-and-pinion steering, four-wheel disc brakes, multi-link front and 5-link rear suspension; and three engine choices, depending on market: A V8 with weight distribution of 53% front / 47% rear and two V6 engines with 52% front / 48% rear weight distribution.

At introduction in the US in summer 2008, standard features included cruise control, automatic headlights, dual-zone automatic air conditioning, leather seat-upholstery and steering wheel, heated front seats with power adjustments, power windows, door locks, and mirrors, remote keyless entry and starting, and a seven-speaker audio system with XM satellite radio.

Two optional Lexicon-branded audio systems offer 7.1 channels and 14 or 17 speakers.

Drivetrains 
The Tau V8 is Hyundai's first domestic V8 engine. Introduced as a midyear change for the 2010 model, the 4.6 L V8 now produces  at 6,500 rpm, with no change in the torque output:  at 3,500 rpm. These figures are achieved using premium fuel. The V8 can also run on regular unleaded, in which case the 2010–11 model produces  and 324 lb-ft. For the V8 model, Hyundai has reported 0– times of less than 6 seconds. Car and Driver reports a 0–60 mph time of 5.3 seconds while Motor Trend reports a 0–60 mph time of 5.5 seconds in their October 2008 issue.

The Lambda 3.8 L V6 is available in Korean and North American models. In Korean spec, the engine produces . Motor Trend reports a 0–60 mph time of 5.9 seconds.

The Lambda 3.3 L V6 is available in some markets, producing .

In North America, the 2009-2011 V8-powered Genesis features a standard ZF 6HP26 6-speed automatic transmission from ZF Friedrichshafen (same as the unit found in the 2004-2010 BMW 5 Series), with the V6 models receiving an Aisin B600 6-speed automatic. The recommended gasoline for the V8 is premium for maximum fuel economy and horsepower, but also runs on regular. The V6 engine is designed for regular grade gasoline.

South Korean models include choice of Lambda 3.3 GDi, Lambda 3.8 GDi engines.

US models include choice of 3.8 Lambda GDi, Tau 4.6 MPi (390PS), 5.0 Tau GDi engines.

Canadian models include choice of 3.8 Lambda GDi, 5.0 Tau GDi (R-Spec only) engines.

Safety 
Standard safety features include dual front airbags, front and rear side airbags, side-curtain airbags, ABS, brake assist, EBD, traction control, and electronic stability control.

 U.S. National Highway Traffic Safety Administration 2009 Genesis:

Frontal Driver: 
Frontal Passenger: 
Side Driver: 
Side Rear Passenger: 
Rollover: 
 "2009–2010 Top Safety Pick" Award by the US Insurance Institute for Highway Safety models mfg after Nov. 2008

Marketing 
As part of the US product launch, Hyundai Motor America and Carbonfund.org unveiled the Genesis Forest Project at the 2008 Los Angeles Auto Show, to offset the entire first year of emissions for all 2009 Hyundai Genesis sedans sold in the United States. The Genesis Forest Project was retroactively applied to all 2009 Genesis sedan sales, which began in June, and continue through the end of the year.

Sold as Hyundai Rohens in China, the unveiling was at the Beijing International Automotive Exhibition, 2008. Sales began in August 2008.

2010 model year updates 
The Premium Navigation Package replaces the previous Premium Plus Package which most notably upgraded to 18-inch alloy wheels, still a part of this new package.

For 2010 the 4.6-liter Genesis was available in only one trim, with all packages made standard, including the Technology package. The car also received a slightly uprated engine as a midyear change, with the 4.6-litre V8 producing  at 6500 rpm and an identical  of torque at 3500 rpm.

5.0 R-Spec (2011–2014) 

This model includes the new Tau 5.0 GDi engine, choice of three exterior colors and black interior. Genesis 5.0 R-Spec includes Genesis 4.6 equipment, plus 19-inch Premium Machined Finish alloy wheels with P235/45R19 tires, Unique headlamps w/dark chrome inserts, Sport-tuned suspension calibration, Unique R-Spec embroidered floor mats, R-Spec rear deck lid badging, deleted woodgrain from leather steering wheel. The vehicle was unveiled in Seoul.

Transmission (2012–2014) 
All models include 8-speed automatic transmission with SHIFTRONIC manual mode.

2012 model year update 
US model was released as 2012 model year vehicle. Engine choices include 3.8 Lambda GDi, 4.6 Tau MPi (390PS), 5.0 Tau GDi for R-Spec. The transmission was changed to 8-speed automatic with SHIFTRONIC.

Changes to US models include:
 Changes to shock and spring rates and rear stabilizer, to provide a smoother ride
 5.0-liter direct-injected Tau V8 engine now exclusive to 5.0 R-Spec model
 Standard 5.0-liter model no longer available
 4.6-liter V8 available
 3.8-liter V6 available in three equipment configurations
 New optional eight-inch touchscreen display with navigation and an enhanced multi-media controller and Driver Information System (DIS)
 Hyundai Blue Link telematics available with Ultimate Navigation package

2014 model year update 
The last changes to US models before the new generation was introduced included greater connectivity options via the Hyundai Blue Link interface, some revised controls, a new exterior body colour (Santiago Silver instead of Platinum Metallic), 18-inch wheels as standard on the base model, and Hyundai's Assurance Connected Care telematics services are standard for three years on all 2014 Genesis sedans equipped with Blue Link.

Second generation (DH; 2013) 

The second generation Genesis was previewed by the "Hyundai HCD-14 Genesis" concept at NAIAS 2013.
The vehicle was unveiled in Seoul, Korea, followed by the 2014 North American International Auto Show, then the 2014 Toronto Auto Show.

Early models include a choice of four engines (Lambda 3.0 GDi, Lambda 3.3 GDi, Lambda 3.8 GDi, Tau 5.0 GDi), rear or all-wheel-drive. All models include eight-speed automatic transmission with manual shift mode and a five star safety rating.

Safety

1 strength-to-weight ratio: 4.95

Engines

Marketing 
A full production version went on sale in South Korea on 8 January 2008 in Hyundai's home market, South Korea. Notably, the Korean market Genesis does not carry a Hyundai badge, only the 'Genesis' emblem.

Hyundai has been criticised by Korean consumers over the price discrepancy between the US and Korean markets. Yonhap reports the Genesis costs "₩58.3 million (US$57,000) in Korea, whereas in the U.S. it sells for $32,000." This has led to dumping allegations and a growing market in reimported Genesises by gray market dealers. Korean regulators are currently investigating whether Hyundai has abused its 75% domestic market share.
However, Hyundai cars in South Korea have more available options and that may be the reason for the mark-ups.

Marketed as the Hyundai Genesis in the US and Canada, the vehicle is the largest, most powerful car that Hyundai has ever marketed there before the launch of the Equus.

The Genesis sedan went on sale in the US in August 2008. In its first five months of sales, the Genesis under-performed in the competitive US market selling only 6,167 units. According to Hyundai, Genesis saw sales of just 1,297 units in its first full sales month and the company expected to move around 8000 units from the US showrooms by the end of 2008. In 2009, the Genesis sold 21,889 units in the U.S. (sedan and coupe combined).

There had been internal discussions within Hyundai about creating a separate brand to feature the Genesis sedan as well as the soon to come Equus sedan in North America, but due to prohibitive costs and potential delays the Genesis and Equus remained tagged with the Hyundai brand until 2016. In late 2016, The Genesis brand became separate from Hyundai in the United States.

The Genesis was not marketed at first in Europe because of Lexus's failure to thrive in Europe. According to a September 2007 article in Tradingmarkets.com, "in the eyes of European purchasers of luxury vehicles, Hyundai sedans have been perceived as having a poor image and unreliable durability compared with its rivals." "The planned launch of Genesis comes at a time when Hyundai is striving to shake off its poor-brand image, known for generous warranties and low prices."

The latest Genesis will be sold in Europe, priced at about €65,000 in Germany.

The Genesis is sold in Latin America in Costa Rica, Dominican Republic, Colombia, Chile and Peru, offering versions with engines of 3.3 and 3.8 liters, and in Brazil only with the 3.8 liters engine.

Australia was the first country in the region to get the Genesis sedan, arriving in November 2014.

Coupe 

A rear wheel drive sports car from Hyundai, dubbed Hyundai Genesis Coupe and sharing the Genesis Sedan's platform and name, was unveiled at the 2008 New York International Auto Show.

Awards 
The Genesis sedan has received numerous awards and recognitions. Among them:
 Named one of the top five luxury sedans in 2008 by the National Automobile Dealers Association
 USA Today stated Hyundai proves it's a master of luxury 2008
 Named as Consumer Reports 'Top-Rated Upscale Sedan' (2009)
 Ranked No. 1 midsize premium car by JD Power 2009 APEAL study (beating out the BMW 5 Series, Jaguar XF),
 Given 9.5 out of 10 points in 2009 by Edmunds.com, which stated it features a cabin comparable to a top-of-the-line Lexus, but pointed to lack of "brand cachet" as its main drawback
 According to Edmunds.com in 2009: "With badges removed, the Genesis could easily pass as a Lexus or Mercedes-Benz, although we doubt many brand-conscious people would give a Hyundai a second glance."
 Named the 2009 North American Car of the Year
 Ranked tops in JD Power's Vehicle Launch Index (VLI),
 Automotive, Performance, Execution awards by J.D. Power,
 Car of the Year by Autotropolis.com,
 Named AutoPacific ideal vehicle 2009 award winner,
 Recognized as a best new model for 2009 by Kiplinger's Personal Finance
 Won top Safety Award by the U.S. Insurance Institute for Highway Safety (IIHS),
 Cars.com New Car of the Year 2009
 Luxury and Value on the 2009 Best New Car List by About.com,
 Car of the Year at the 2009 Urban Wheel Awards by Wheels Media,
 Named a "Top 5 Luxury Car for 2009" & "Car of the Month (April)" & "Best Car Buy" by the U.S. National Automobile Dealers Association (NADAguides.com),
 2009 "Best Bet" award from The Car Book,
 Won MyRide/Autobytel 2009 Editors' Choice award,
 Named a Consumer Guide recommended buy 2009,
Consumers Digest (luxury segment) 2009 best buy,
 America's Top 40 New Cars by Motor Trend 2009,
 Assessed as having the highest residual value by the 2009 Automotive Lease Guide
 According to the editor-in-chief blog of Motor Trend, "Hyundai Genesis: A Car Detroit Can Now Only Dream of Building?", The Genesis came close to winning the 2009 Motor Trend Car of the Year title.
 Hyundai Genesis sedan awarded as segment leader for the 2009 near-luxury car class of vehicles by Strategic Vision
 AutoPacific's 2009 consumer Vehicle Satisfaction survey of Hyundai owners placed the Genesis at the top of its class in Awards (VSA) research.
 Named "Best Luxury Sedan" in MotorWeek's 2009 Driver's Choice Awards.
 Named 2009 North American Car of the Year, the first for Hyundai.
 Won 2009 Canadian Car of the Year after winning its category of Best New Luxury Car under $50,000.
 Won 2009 Car of the Year award by China's Autoworld magazine.
 Hyundai's V8 Tau engine received 2009 Ward's 10 Best Engines award.
 Named "Best Deal for the Boss" in the Cars.com 2010 annual Best Lifestyle Vehicle Awards
 Based on automotive journalist reviews, The Genesis received a score of 89% on Seven Car Garage, making it one of the best reviewed cars in its class.

References

External links 

 Hyundai Genesis official website: Global, US, South Korea 
 GENESIS Official Website: WorldWide, Korea, Canada

2010s cars
All-wheel-drive vehicles
Cars introduced in 2008
Executive cars
Full-size vehicles
Genesis
Luxury vehicles
Rear-wheel-drive vehicles
Sedans